GHF may refer to:
 Ghana Air Force
 Giebelstadt Airport, in Germany
 Global Heritage Fund
 Global Humanitarian Forum
 Greenland Handball Federation